Ravi Mandlik रवि मंडलिक (born 1960, Achalpur, Maharashtra, India) is an Indian artist.
He completed his G.D. Art in painting from Sir J. J. School of Art, Mumbai. He was a member of the teaching faculty of L.S. Raheja School of Art, Mumbai and Sir J. J. School of Art, Mumbai, Maharashtra , India.

Exhibitions

1999: W/N Millennium Show at London, Brussels, Stockholm, and New York
1995: Yokohama Citizens Gallery, Japan
2007: The Ueno Royal Museum Tokyo
2007: Power of Peace, Bali, organized by Tao art gallery
2007: International show organized by Articulate, New York
2006: The Indiart Show
2002: The Chapel Gallery, Singapore: Maratha Kaleidoscope, Al Diyafa Center, Satwa, Dubai

Awards
1999: the Winsor & Newton worldwide millennium painting competition
1995-96: the Bendre-Hussain Scholarship awarded from BAS Mumbai
1992 : the International awarded of Seychelles Visual Art Biennale from the Seychelles
1985 : Govt.award from the Art Society of India
1985 : Usha Deshmukh Gold-Medal from Sir J.J. School of Art
1984 : Fellowship from Sir J. J. School of Art

Gallery

References
http://www.saffronart.com/sitepages/ArticleDetails.aspx?Articleid=566&PageNo=1
http://www.theartstrust.com/artistprofile.aspx?artistid=48&name=Ravi%C2%A0Mandlik
http://www.mojarto.com/artists/ravi-mandlik-10903
http://photogallery.indiatimes.com/topic/Ravi-Mandlik?source=toitopic
https://www.mojarto.com/artists/ravi-mandlik-10903/overview
http://dhoomimalartcentre.com/artists/ravi-mandlik
http://www.crimsonartgallery.com/html/ravi_mandlik.html
http://www.merinews.com/article/ravi-mandlik--painter-by-profession/141840.shtml
http://www.karinwebergallery.com/artists/exhibited/RaviMandlik/en/
http://photogallery.indiatimes.com/events/mumbai/kiran-rao-ravi-mandliks-art-show/articleshow/12622659.cms
http://www.pinkvilla.com/entertainmenttags/kiran-rao/kiran-rao-ravi-mandlik-art-event
http://infinitexprezions.com/artist_detail.php?id=17&name=Ravi%20Mandlik
https://web.archive.org/web/20160303210926/http://artindiamag.com/quarter14_06_12/listings_national_international.html

External links

http://dhoomimalartcentre.com/artists/ravi-mandlik
http://ngmaindia.gov.in/collections-artist.asp?strLetter=M
http://www.dailymotion.com/video/xg26o0_i-learnt-painting-for-dhobi-ghat-aamir_news
http://portal.unesco.org/ci/en/ev.php-URL_ID=28505&URL_DO=DO_TOPIC&URL_SECTION=201.html
http://indiatoday.intoday.in/story/Arty+facts/1/8278.html
http://www.vervemagazine.in/arts-and-culture/india-art-festival-2015-mumbai-delhi
http://timesofindia.indiatimes.com/life-style/people/Of-blue-red-and-other-colours/articleshow/27364170.cms
http://www.dnaindia.com/lifestyle/report-when-young-artists-got-a-hang-of-the-old-1292065
http://www.indiaprwire.com/pressrelease/art/2009120138689.htm

Indian male painters
Indian contemporary painters
Sir Jamsetjee Jeejebhoy School of Art alumni
1960 births
Living people
People from Amravati district
20th-century Indian painters
21st-century Indian painters
Painters from Maharashtra
20th-century Indian male artists
21st-century Indian male artists